Château La Gurgue is a wine from Margaux AOC. The actual owner is Claire Villars-Lurton who own also Château Ferrière, Château Haut-Bages Libéral and Château Domeyne.

History 

The history of Château LaGurgue is closely linked to the village of Margaux. Successively, two owners of the vineyard raced for the Town Hall of Margaux and won.The first was a wealthy Portuguese banker, Mr. Peixotto. In 1871, he added to the vineyard some lands, which were located around the Parish of Margaux. Later, another mayor of Margaux, Mr Camille Lenoir became the owner of 
Château La Gurgue. He gave his name to the Château and enriched it with some valuable plots surrounded by the vineyard of Château 
Margaux.

The Château then returned to its original name "La Gurgue", which is a locality of the village.

In 1978, Jacques Merlaut and his daughter Bernadette Villars, already owner of Château Chasse-Spleen, bought Château La Gurgue. Since 1993, Claire Villars-Lurton has carried on the work of her mother and grandfather.

Technical information

References 

Château La Gurgue official site

External links
Château La Gurgue official site

Bordeaux wine producers